The Chera dynasty (or Cēra), was an ancient Tamil dynasty who are credited as the creators of land of Kerala as they have unified various regions of the western coast and western ghats to form the early Chera empire.

The Chera country was geographically well placed to profit from maritime trade via the extensive Indian Ocean networks. Exchange of spices, especially black pepper, with Middle Eastern and Graeco-Roman merchants are attested in several sources. The Cheras of the early historical period (c. second century BCE – c. third century CE) are known to have had their original centre at Kuttanad in Kerala, and harbours at Muchiri (Muziris) and Thondi (Tyndis) on the Indian Ocean coast (Kerala) and Kongunadu. They governed the area of Malabar Coast between Alappuzha in the south to Kasaragod in the north. The region around Coimbatore was ruled by the Cheras during the Sangam period between c. 1st and the 4th centuries CE and it served as the eastern entrance to the Palakkad Gap, the principal trade route between the Malabar Coast and Tamil Nadu. However the southern region of the present-day Kerala state (The coastal belt between Thiruvananthapuram and southern Alappuzha) was under Ay dynasty, who was more related to the Pandya dynasty of Madurai.

The early historic pre-Pallava polities are often described as a "kinship-based redistributive economies" largely shaped by "pastoral-cum-agrarian subsistence" and "predatory politics". Old Tamil Brahmi cave label inscriptions, describe Ilam Kadungo, son of Perum Kadungo, and the grandson of Ko Athan Cheral of the Irumporai clan. Inscribed portrait coins with Brahmi legends give a number of Chera names, with the Chera symbols of the bow and the arrow depicted in the reverse. The anthologies of early Sangham texts are a major source of information about the early Cheras. Cenguttuvan, or the good Chera, is famous for the traditions surrounding Kannaki, the principal female character of the Sangam epic poem Cilappatikaram. After the end of the early historical period, around the 3rd-5th century CE, there seems to be a period where the Cheras' power declined considerably.

Cheras of the Kongu country are known to have controlled eastern Kerala and only a few kilometres of current western Tamil Nadu in the early medieval period. Present-day central Kerala and Kongu Cheras detached around 8th-9th century CE to form the Chera Perumal kingdom and Kongu chera kingdom(c. 9th- 12th century CE). The exact nature of the relationships between the various branches of Chera rulers is somewhat unclear. After this, the present Kerala parts and Kongunadu became autonomous. Some of the major dynasties of medieval south India - Chalukya, Pallava, Pandya, Rashtrakuta, and Chola - seems to have conquered the Kongu Chera country. Kongu Cheras appear to have been absorbed into the Pandya political system by 10th/11th century CE. Even after the dissolution of the Perumal kingdom, royal inscriptions and temple grants, especially from outside Kerala proper, continued to refer the country and the people as the "Cheras or Keralas".

The rulers of Venad (the Venad Cheras or the "Kulasekharas"), based out of the port of Kollam in south Kerala, claimed their ancestry from the Perumals. Cheranad was also the name of an erstwhile province in the kingdom of Zamorin of Calicut, which had included parts of present-day Tirurangadi and Tirur Taluks of Malappuram district in it. Later it became a Taluk of Malabar District, when Malabar came under the British Raj. The headquarters of Cheranad Taluk was the town of Tirurangadi. Later the Taluk was merged with Eranad Taluk. In the modern period the rulers of Cochin and Travancore (in Kerala) also claimed the title "Chera".

Etymology 
The term Chera - and its variant form "Keralaputas" - stands for the ruling lineage and the country associated with them.

The etymology of "Chera" is still a matter of considerable speculation among historians. One approach proposes that the word is derived from Cheral, a corruption of Charal meaning "declivity of a mountain" in Tamil, suggesting a connection with the mountainous geography of Kerala. Another theory argues that the "Cheralam" is derived from "cher" (sand) and "alam" (region), literally meaning, "the slushy land". Apart from the speculations mentioned, a number of other theories do appear in historical studies.

In ancient non-Tamil sources, the Cheras are referred to by various names. The Cheras are referred as Kedalaputo (Sanskrit: "Kerala Putra") in the Emperor Ashoka's Pali edicts (3rd century BCE). While Pliny the Elder and Claudius Ptolemy refer to the Cheras as Kaelobotros and Kerobottros respectively, the Graeco-Roman trade map Periplus Maris Erythraei refers to the Cheras as Keprobotras. All these Graeco-Roman names are evidently corruptions of "Kedala Puto/Kerala Putra" probably received through relations with northern India.

The term Cheralamdivu or Cheran Tivu and its cognates, meaning the "island of the Chera kings", is a Classical Tamil name of Sri Lanka that takes root from the term "Chera".

Cheras of ancient south India 

Recent studies on ancient south Indian history suggest that the three major rulers – the Pandya, the Chera and the Chola – based originally in Madurai in Tamil Nadu, Vanchi, present day Karur, in Tamilnadu and Uraiyur(Tiruchirappalli) in Tamil Nadu, respectively. They had established outlets on the Indian Ocean namely Korkai, Muchiri (Muziris), and Kaveripattinam respectively. Territory of the Chera chiefdom of the early historical period (pre-Pallava) consisted of the present day northern-central Kerala and Kongu region western Tamil Nadu. The rest of kerala was under Ay dynasty (southern tip of Kerala) and Mushika dyansty (northern tip of Kerala).The political structure of the chiefdom was based on communal holding of resources and kinship-based production. The authority was determined by "the range of redistributive social relationships sustained through predatory accumulation of resources". There was more than one branch of the Chera family ruling at the same time and contenting for leadership (one in central Kerala and the other one in western Tamil Nadu).

The Cheras are referred to as Kedalaputo (Sanskrit: "Kerala Putra") in the Emperor Ashoka's Pali edicts (3rd century BCE, Rock Edicts II and XII). The earliest Graeco-Roman accounts referring to the Cheras are by Pliny the Elder in the 1st century CE, in the Periplus of the 1st century CE, and by Claudius Ptolemy in the 2nd century CE.

There are also brief references in the present forms of the works by author and commentator Katyayana (c. 3rd - 4th century BCE), author and philosopher Patanjali (c. 5th century BCE) and Maurya statesman and philosopher Kautilya (Chanakya) [though Sanskrit grammarian Panini (c. 6th - 5th century BCE) does not mention either the people or the land].

Archaeological discoveries 

Archaeology has found epigraphic and numismatic evidence of the Early Cheras. Two almost identical inscriptions discovered from Pugalur (near Karur) dated to c. 1st - 2nd century CE, describe three generations of Chera rulers of the Irumporai lineage. They record the construction of a rock shelter for Jains on the occasion of the investiture of Ilam Kadungo, son of Perum Kadungo, and the grandson of Ko Athan Cheral Irumporai.

A short Brahmi inscription, containing the word Chera ("Kadummi Pudha Chera") was found at Edakkal in the Western Ghats.

Recent archaeological discoveries increasingly confirm Karur as a political, economic and cultural centre of ancient south India. Excavations at Karur yielded huge quantities of copper coins with Chera symbols such as the bow and arrow, Roman amphorae and Roman coins. An ancient route, from the harbours in Kerala (such as Muchiri or Thondi) through the Palghat Gap to Karur in interior Tamil Nadu can be traced with the help of archaeological evidence. Historians are yet to precisely locate Muziris, known in Tamil as "Muchiri", a base of the Chera rulers. Archaeological excavations at Pattanam (near Cochin) suggest a strong case of identification with the location. Roman coins have over a period of time been discovered in large numbers from central Kerala and the Coimbatore-Karur region (from locations such as Kottayam-Kannur, Valluvally, Iyyal, Vellalur and Kattankanni).

Chera coinage 
A number of coins, assumed to be of the Cheras, mostly found in the Amaravati riverbed in Tamil Nadu, are a major source of early Chera historiography. This includes a number of punch marked coins discovered from Amaravati riverbed. The square coins of copper and its alloys or silver have also been discovered. Most of these early square coins show a bow and arrow, the traditional emblem of the Cheras on the obverse, with or without any legend. Silver-punch marked coins, an imitation of the Maurya coins, and with a Chera bow on the reverse, have been reported. Hundreds of copper coins, attributed to the Cheras, have been discovered from Pattanam in central Kerala. Bronze dies for minting punch marked coins were discovered from a riverbed in Karur.

Other discoveries include a coin with a portrait and the Brahmi legend "Mak-kotai" above it and another one with a portrait and the legend "Kuttuvan Kotai" above it. Both impure silver coins are tentatively dated to c. 1st century CE or a little later. The reverse side of both coins are blank. The impure silver coins bearing Brahmi legends "Kollippurai", "Kollipporai", "Kol-Irumporai" and "Sa Irumporai" were also discovered from Karur. The portrait coins are generally considered as imitation of Roman coins. All legends, assumed to be the names of the Chera rulers, were in Tamil-Brahmi characters on the obverse. Reverse often contained the bow and arrow symbol. An alliance between the Cholas is evident from a joint coin bearing the Chola tiger on the obverse and the Chera bow and arrow on the reverse. Lakshmi-type coins of possible Sri Lankan origin have also been discovered from Karur.

The macro analysis of the Mak-kotai coin shows close similarities with the contemporary Roman silver coin. A silver coin with the portrait of a person wearing a Roman-type bristled-crown helmet was also discovered from Amaravati riverbed in Karur. Reverse side of the coin depicts a bow and arrow, the traditional symbol of the Chera family.

Cheras from early Tamil texts 
A large body of Tamil works collectively known as the Sangam (Academy) texts (c. 2nd century BCE- 3rd century CE) describes a number of Chera, Pandya and Chola rulers. Among them, the most important sources for the Cheras are the Pathitrupattu, the Akananuru, and the Purananuru. The Pathitrupattu, the fourth book in the Ettuthokai anthology, mentions a number of rulers and heirs-apparent of the Chera family. Each ruler is praised in ten songs sung by a court poet. However, the book is not worked into connected history and settled chronology so far.

A method known as Gajabahu-Chenguttuvan synchronism, is used by some historians to date the events described in the early Tamil texts to c. 1st - 2nd century CE. Despite its dependency on numerous conjectures, the method is considered as the sheet anchor for the purpose of dating the events in the early Tamil texts. Ilango Adigal author of the legendary Tamil epic poem Chilapathikaram describes Chenguttuvan as his elder brother. He also mentions Chenguttuvan's decision to propitiate a temple (virakkallu) for the goddess Pattini (Kannaki) at Vanchi. A certain king called Gajabahu, often identified with Gajabahu, king of Sri Lanka (2nd century CE), was present at the Pattini festival at Vanchi. In this context, Chenguttuvan can be dated to either the first or last quarter of the 2nd century CE.

Uthiyan Cheral Athan is generally considered as the earliest known ruler of the Chera family from the Sangam texts (and the possible hero of the lost first decade of Pathitrupattu). Uthiyan Cheral was also known as "Vanavaramban" (Purananuru). His headquarters were at Kuzhumur near Kuttanad(Akananuru). He is described as the Chera ruler who prepared food ("the Perum Chotru") for Pandavas and the Kauravas at the Kurukshetra War (Purananuru and Akananuru). He Married Nallini, daughter of Veliyan Venman, and was the father of Imayavaramban Nedum Cheralathan (Pathitrupattu (II)).

Uthiyan Cheral Athan is probably identical with the Perum Cheral Athan who fought against the Chola Karikala at the battle of Venni. In the battle of Venni, the Chera was wounded on the back by the Chola ruler Karikala. Unable to bear the disgrace, the Chera committed suicide by slow starvation.

As the name Pathitrupattu indicates, they were ten texts, each consisting a decade of lyrics; but of these two have not till now been discovered.

The following Cheras are knowns from Purananuru collection (some of the names are re-duplications).

 Karuvur Eriya Ol-val Ko Perum Cheral Irumporai - Ruled of Karuvur. Praised by Nariveruttalaiyar.
 Kadungo Valia Athan
 Palai Padiya Perum Kadumko
 Antuvan Cheral Irumporai - father of Selva Kadumko Valia Athan (VII decade). Contemporary to Chola Mudittalai Ko Perunar Killi (whose elephant famously wandered to Karuvur).
 "Yanaikatchai" Mantaram Cheral Irumporai ruled from Kollimalai (near Karur Vanchi) in the east to Thondi and Mantai on the western coast. He defeated his enemies in a battle at Vilamkil. The famous Pandya ruler Nedum Chezhian (early 3rd century CE) captured Mantaran Cheral as a prisoner. However, he managed to escape and regain the lost territories.
 Ko Kodai Marban
 Takadur Erinta Perum Cheral Irumporai
 Kuttuvan Kodai
 Kudakko Nedum Cheral Athan
 Perum Cheral Athan
 Kanaikkal Irumporai is said to have defeated a chief called Muvan and imprisoned him. The Chera then brutally pulled out the teeth of the prisoner and planted them on the gates of the city of Thondi. Upon capture by the Chola ruler Sengannan, Kanaikkal committed suicide by starvation.
 Kudakko Cheral Irumporai
 Kottambalattu Tunchiya Makkodai - probably identical with Kottambalattu Tunchiya Cheraman in Akananuru (168)
 Vanchan
 Kadalottiya Vel Kelu Kuttuvan
 Man Venko - a friend of the Pandya Ugra Peruvaluti and the Chola Rajasuyam Vetta Perunar Killi.

Cheras in the medieval period 

After the end of the early historical period in south India, c. 3rd-5th century CE, there seems to be a period where the Chera family's political prestige and influence declined considerably. Little is known for certain about the Cheras during this period.

Cheras of Kongu country (Karur) initially appear as the rulers of western Tamil Nadu and central Kerala. There was a domination of present-day Kerala regions of the ancient Chera country by the Kongu Cheras/Keralas (probably via some form of viceregal rule). The family claimed that they were descended from the Cheras who flourished in pre-Pallava (early historic) south India.

 An inscription of Kadamba king Vishnu Varma, dated 5th or 6th century, can be found at Edakkal cave in Wayanad. An early historic Chera graffiti containing the phrase "Kadummi Putra Chera" was also discovered from the cave.
Tradition tells that the Kalabhra (Kalvar) rulers kept the Chera, Chola and Pandya rulers in their confinement.
 The earliest Chalukya king to claim overlorship over Chera/Kerala is Kirttivarman I (fl. 566 - 598 CE) (this claim is generally considered as a "boastfull exaggeration" by historians). A later grant (695 CE) of king Vinayaditya II Satyasraya, with reference to the vassalage of the Kerala country, is now reckoned as a more dependable record. Several Chalukya records of the 7th and 8th centuries speak of the conquest and vassalage of the Kerala country.
 A number of Pallava records also mention the vassalage of the Kerala country. 
Rashtrakuta inscriptions mention "an alliance of Dravida kings including Kerala, Pandya, Chola and Pallava who were defeated" (E. I., XVIII). The Keralas mentioned there might be the Kongu Cheras who had already submitted to the Pandyas (and not Chera Perumals of Kerala).

Pandya conquests in Chera country 

There are clear attestations of repeated Pandya conquests of the Kerala or Chera country in the 7th and 8th centuries CE.

 Pandya king Sendan/Jayantan (fl. 645 – 70 CE) was known as the Vanavan, an ancient name for the Chera king. Arikesari Maravarman (670 – 710 CE), another Pandya ruler, probably defeated the Keralas/Cheras on several occasions. His successor Ko Chadayan Ranadhira also made gains against the Cheras.
 The so-called "renewal of the capital city of Vanchi (Karur) along with Kudal (Madurai) and Kozhi (Uraiyur)", described in the Madras Museum Plates of the Pandya king Rajasimha I (730 – 65 CE), may suggest a Pandya occupation of the Kongu Chera capital Karur.
It is known that when Pandya king Jatila Parantaka (765 – 815 CE) went to war against the Adigaman of Tagadur (Dharmapuri), the Keralas and the Pallavas went to the aid of the latter though "the Pandyas drove them back to the quarters from which they had emerged" (Madras Museum Plates). Perhaps the Chera branch from present-day Kerala had crossed the Ghat Mountains to offer support to the Adigaman and after defeat they were pursued up to the Palghat Gap by the Pandya forces.

Present-day central Kerala probably detached from Kongu Chera/Kerala kingdom (around 8th-9th century CE) to form the Chera/Perumal kingdom.
The Pandyas are known to have made a defensive alliance with the Cheras of Kongu country (who were under their influence) in this period. Pandya king Parantaka Vira Narayana (c. 880 – 900 CE) is known to have married a Kerala (Kongu Chera) princess "Vanavan Maha Devi". The son of this alliance, Rajasimha, described as a member of Chandra-Aditya Kula (Sinnamanur copper plates), was "destroyed by the Chola king Parantaka". It was initially assumed by K. A. N. Sastri and E. P. N. K. Pillai that the Vira Narayana had married a Chera Perumal princess of Kerala.

Chola conquests of Chera country 

The Kongu country was conquered by the Cholas (either by Srikantha or Aditya I Chola) in the last years of the 9th century CE (this campaign probably involved battles between Aditya I and Parantaka Vira Narayana). The Pandyas were eventually defeated in the "great battle" of Sripurambiyam (c. 885).
The Pandyas were defeated by Chola king Parantaka in 910 CE (the fate of the Kongu Chera country, then ruled by Kongu Cheras, upon the fall of Madurai is not known). Pandya king Rajasimha II, who was defeated by Parantaka Chola, is known to have found asylum in Kerala or Chera country (c. 920 CE). Chola king Sundara (c. 956 – c. 973 CE) had a Chera or Kerala princess among his queens.
Kongu Chera country (and the Chera Perumal kingdom) was subsequently conquered by the Cholas.
Amara Bhujanga Deva, one of the princes defeated by Chola king Rajaraja (Tiruvalangadu Grant), was probably a Pandya or a Kongu Chera prince. 
Chola king Rajadhiraja is known for defeating certain Vira Kerala, one of the so-called "thennavar muvar", and trampling him to death by his war elephant. This royal was probably a Kongu-Chera of Chandra-Aditya Kula or a Pandya prince (son of a Pandya and a Kongu Chera princess). Vira Kerala was previously considered as a Chera Perumal king (K. A. N. Sastri and E. P. N. K. Pillai).

Chera Perumals of Kerala 

While the Pallava and Pandya rulers in Tamil Nadu emerged into established kingship by c. 5th - 6th centuries CE, the formation of the monarchical polity in Kerala took place not before c. 9th century CE. The Chera Perumals are known to have ruled what is now Kerala between c. 9th and 12th century CE. Scholars tend to identify Alvar saint Kulasekhara and Nayanar saint Cherman Perumal (literally "the Chera king") with some of the earliest Perumals.

The exact nature of the relation between the Cheras of Kongu and the Chera Perumals remains obscure. The Nambutiris asked for a regent of the Chera king from Karur in Coimbatore and were granted the prime minister hailing from Pundurai. Hence the Zamorin holds the title 'Punthurakkon' (King from Punthura). After this, the Malabar and Kerala parts became autonomous of Karur. The Perumal kingdom derived most of its wealth from maritime trade relations (the spice trade) with the Middle East. The port of Kollam, in the kingdom, was a major point in overseas India trade to the West and the East Asia. Political units known as "nadus", controlled by powerful hereditary chiefs or by households, occupied central importance in the structuring of the Chera Perumal state. The rulers of the nadus usually acted with the help of a Nair military retinue. The prominent nadus continued to exist even after the end of the Chera rule during the beginning of the 12th century. Nambudiri-Brahmin settlements of agriculturally rich areas (fertile wet land) were another major source of support to the kingdom.

The Chera Perumal kingdom had alternating friendly or hostile relations with the Cholas and the Pandyas. The kingdom was attacked, and eventually forced into submission, by the Cholas in the early 11th century CE (in order to break the monpoly of trade with the Middle East). When the Perumal kingdom was eventually dissolved in the 12th century most of its autonomous chiefdoms became independent.

Government
The extent and nature of state formation of the Chera kingdoms, from the ancient period to early modern period, cannot be interpreted either in a linear or in a monochromatic way. Each ruling family had its own political prestige and influence in southern India over their life spans.

The extent of political formation in pre-Pallava south India (before c. third century CE) was a matter of considerable debate among historians. Although earlier scholars visualised early historic south Indian polities as full-fledged kingdoms, some of the recent studies rule out the possibility of state formation. According to historian Rajan Gurukkal, ancient south India was a combination of several "unevenly evolved and kinship based redistributive economies of chiefdoms". These polities were structured by the dominance of "agro-pastoral means of subsistence and predatory politics". Kesavan Veluthat, another prominent historian of south India, uses the term "chief" and "chiefdom" for the Chera ruler and Chera polity of early historic south India respectively.

Reaching conclusions based on the early Tamil poems and archaeological evidences is another topic of disagreement. It is assumed that the institution of sabha in south Indian villages, for local administration, was first surfaced during the early historic period.

Economy
The early Chera economy can be described as a predominantly "pastoral-cum-agrarian" based system. The emphasis on agriculture increased with time, and provided the base for larger economic change. The early historic south India (c. second century BCE-c. third century CE) can be described as a "semi-tribal political economy". In a 2013 paper, historian Rajan Gurukkal describes ancient south India as a collection of "unevenly evolved and kinship-based redistributive economies."

Spice trade

Exchange relations with the merchants from Graeco-Roman world, the "Yavanas", and with north India provided considerable economic momentum for the Chera chiefdom. Indian Ocean exchange was the major economic activity. There is some difference of opinion with regard to the nature of the "spice trade" in ancient Chera country. It is disputed whether this "trade" with the Mediterranean world was managed on equal terms by the Tamil merchants, in view of the existence of apparently unequal political institutions in south India. Some of the more recent studies point out that the "trade" was an exchange of "serious imbalance", because of its being between the Roman Empire and South India with uneven chiefdoms.

The geographical advantages, like the favourable Monsoon winds which carried ships directly from the Arabia to south India as well as the abundance of exotic spices in the interior Ghat mountains (and the presence of a large number of rivers connecting the Ghats with the Arabian Sea) combined to make the Cheras a major power in ancient southern India. Spice exchange with Middle Eastern and Mediterranean (Graeco-Roman) navigators can be traced back to before the Common Era and was substantially consolidated in the early years of the Common Era. In the first century CE, the Romans conquered Egypt, which probably helped them to establish dominance in the Indian Ocean spice trade. The earliest Graeco-Roman accounts referring to the Cheras are by Pliny the Elder in the 1st century CE, in Periplus Maris Erythraei of the 1st century CE, and by Claudius Ptolemy in the 2nd century CE. The Periplus Maris Erythraei portrays the "trade" in the territory of Keprobotras in detail. Muziris was the most important centre in the Malabar Coast, which according to the Periplus, "abounded with large ships of Romans, Arabs and Greeks". Bulk spices, ivory, timber, pearls and gems were "exported" from the Chera country to the Middle East and Mediterranean kingdoms.

It is known that the Romans brought vast amounts of gold in exchange for black pepper. This is testified by the Roman coin hoards that have been found in various parts of Kerala and Tamil Nadu. Pliny the Elder, in the 1st century CE, laments the drain of Roman gold into India and China for luxuries such as spices, silk and muslin. The spice trade across the Indian Ocean dwindled with the decline of the Roman empire in the 3rd - 4th centuries CE. With the exit of the Mediterranean from the spice trade, their space was picked up by the Chinese and Arab navigators.

Wootz steel
The famous damascus blades resulted from the unique properties of wootz crucible steel from medieval south India and Sri Lanka. There are several ancient Tamil, Greek, Chinese and Roman literary references to high-carbon Indian steel. The crucible steel production process started in the 6th century BC at Kodumanal in Tamil Nadu, Golconda in Telangana, Karnataka and Sri Lanka. This steel was termed "the finest steel in the world" by the Romans who referred to it by the term "Seric". It was exported to Rome, Egypt, China and the Middle East by 500 BC. The steel was exported as cakes of steely iron that came to be known as "Wootz".

The method was to heat black magnetite ore in the presence of carbon in a sealed clay crucible inside a charcoal furnace to completely remove slag. An alternative was to smelt the ore first to give wrought iron, then heat and hammer it to remove slag. The carbon source was bamboo and leaves from plants such as Avārai. The Chinese and locals in Sri Lanka adopted the production methods of creating wootz steel from the Cheras by the 5th century BC. In Sri Lanka, this early steel-making method employed a unique wind furnace, driven by the monsoon winds. Production sites from antiquity have emerged, in places such as Anuradhapura, Tissamaharama and Samanalawewa, as well as imported artifacts of ancient iron and steel from Kodumanal. A 200 BC Tamil trade guild in Tissamaharama, in the South East of Sri Lanka, brought with them some of the oldest iron and steel artifacts and production processes to the island from the classical period.

Society and culture

Early Cheras 
In general, early Tamil texts reflect the southern Indian cultural tradition as well as elements of the northern Indian cultural tradition, which by now was beginning to come into contact with southern India. It is logical to conclude that most of the Chera population followed native Dravidian religions. Religious practice might have consisted predominantly of conducting sacrifices to various gods, such as to the pre-eminent god Murugan. The worship of departed heroes was a common practice in the Chera territory, along with tree worship and other kinds of ancestor worship. The war goddess Korravai was propitiated with elaborate offerings of meat and toddy. It is theorised that Kottava was assimilated into the present-day form of the goddess Durga. It is thought that the first wave of Brahmin migration came to the Chera territory around the 3rd century BCE with or behind the Jain and Buddhist missionaries. It was only in the 8th century CE that the Aryanisation of the old Chera country reached its organised form. Though the vast majority of the population followed native practices, a small percentage of the population, mainly migrants, followed Jainism, Buddhism and Brahmanism. Populations of Jews and Christians were also known to have lived in Kerala.

Early Tamil texts do make a number of references to social stratification, as expressed by use of the word kudi ("group") to denote "caste". A striking feature of the social life of the early historic period (c. second century BCE-c. third century CE) is the high status accorded to women.

Agriculture and pastoralism were the primary occupations of the people. Various agricultural occupations such as harvesting, threshing and drying are described in the early Tamil texts. Poets and musicians were held in high regard in society. Early Tamil texts are full of references about the lavish patronage extended to court poets. There were professional poets and poetesses who composed texts praising their patrons and were generously rewarded for this.

See also 
 Chola dynasty
 Pandya dynasty
 Pallava dynasty

References

Books cited

Encyclopedic articles

Journal articles

Magazine articles

Newspaper reports/features

External links 

 Tamil Coins: A Study (1981) R. Nagaswamy, Tamil Nadu State Department of Archaeology

Chera dynasty
Dynasties of India
Hindu dynasties
Kingdoms of Kerala
Tamil monarchs
Empires and kingdoms of India
History of Tamil Nadu
States and territories established in the 3rd century BC
Tamil history
History of Kerala
States and territories disestablished in the 12th century
3rd-century BC establishments in India
12th-century disestablishments in India